Damer Leslie Allen (30 January 1878 – disappeared 18 April 1912) was an Irish-born British aviator. He disappeared in April 1912 while attempting to fly from Holyhead, Wales, to Ireland in a Blériot monoplane, and was presumed dead shortly after.

Allen had initially set off from Hendon Aerodrome together with his friend and fellow pilot Denys Corbett Wilson who successfully completed his flight to Ireland, the first complete flight between Great Britain and Ireland, on 22 April. Although it was reported that their flights were the result of a wager between the two men, this was subsequently denied.

The following week, on 26 April, Vivian Hewitt successfully completed a flight between Holyhead and Dublin, landing in the Phoenix Park. Interviewed by the press, he expressed the view that Allen had been insufficiently experienced as an aviator for a flight of such difficulty.

Disappearance and aftermath
On 24 June 1912, the High Court in London made an order that Allen should be presumed to have died on or after 18 April 1912. A consulting engineer by profession, Allen left an estate valued at £6,923 15s 8d. At the time of his death, Allen was being sued in the English courts for the recovery of a portrait of Lady Anne Ponsonby by Thomas Gainsborough, which he had sold at Christie's for 8,300 guineas (£8,715). On 11 February 1913, after a seven-day trial, the jury returned a verdict for the defendants, including the executors of Allen's will.

See also 
List of people who disappeared mysteriously at sea

References

1878 births
1910s missing person cases
1912 deaths
British aviators
Irish aviators
Missing aviators
Missing person cases in Ireland